Almendra Yamileth Mercado Duarte (born 16 March 1998) is a Mexican professional boxer who has held the WBC female super bantamweight title since 2019. As of April 2021, she is ranked as the world's second best active female super bantamweight by BoxRec.

Professional career
Mercado made her professional debut on 19 July 2014, scoring a first-round unanimous decision (UD) victory over Yoatzin Meraz at the Gimnasio Municipal in Nuevo Casas Grandes, Mexico. She had one more fight in 2014–a UD win against Susana Uribe in December–before securing three more wins in 2015; technical knockout (TKO) wins over Karla Valenzuela in March and Estefania Talamantes in August; followed by an eight-round UD win over Lesly Morales in November.

She had two wins over Diana Gutierrez in 2016–a third-round TKO in March and a six-round UD in an August rematch–before going on to fight Jessica Munoz for the vacant WBC FECOMBOX female super bantamweight title. The bout took place on 3 March 2017 at the Gimnasio Municipal in Nuevo Casas Grandes. Mercado suffered her first professional defeat via UD over ten rounds, with the three judges scoring the bout 100–90, 99–91 and 98–92 in favour of Munoz. Mercado bounced back with two more wins at the end of 2017; a UD against Milagros Diaz in November and a corner retirement (RTD) victory over Juana Felix in December.

She competed four times in 2018, securing UD wins over Marisol Corona in January; Debani Balderas in March; and Beatriz Arangure in June. Her final fight of the year was a world title shot against reigning WBC female super bantamweight champion Fatuma Zarika. The bout took place on 8 September at the Kenyatta International Convention Centre in Nairobi, Kenya. Mercado lost in her first attempt at world honours via split decision (SD), with two judges scoring the bout 99–91 and 97–93 in favour of Zarika, while the third scored it 96–94 to Mercado.

Her first fight of 2019 was on 16 February at the Poliforum in Ciudad Cuauhtémoc, Mexico. Mercado defeated Alys Sanchez via UD over ten rounds with the three judges scoring the bout 100–90, 99–91 and 96–93, awarding Mercado the vacant WBC International title. She successfully defended her title by UD against Karina Fernandez on 28 June, with all three judges scoring the bout 97–91. Her final fight of 2019 was a rematch against WBC world champion Fatuma Zarika. The bout took place on 16 November at the Poliforum in Ciudad Cuauhtémoc. Mercado captured the WBC super bantamweight title via UD over ten rounds. Two judges scored the bout 98–92 while the third scored it 99–91.

In 2020 Yamileth defeated Irasema Rayas by TKO on the round number 4. Then she defended her super bantamweight title against Alejandra Guzmán and Angelica Rascón winning both fight via unanimous decision. 

In 2021 Yamileth went up to featherweight to face the champion Amanda Serrano for both of her titles on the Jake Paul vs. Tyrone Woodley undercard, however after a close match Amanda took the victory via unanimous decision.

Professional boxing record

References

External links

Living people
People from Tórshavn
1998 births
Mexican women boxers
Super-bantamweight boxers
World Boxing Council champions